

2016–17 FEI World Cup Jumping
 April 9, 2016 – December 3, 2016: 2016 FEI World Cup Jumping –  League
 Winner:  Jun Takada (with horse Zilvana Verte)
 April 22, 2016 – October 7, 2016: 2016 FEI World Cup Jumping –  League
 Winner:  Patrick Lam (with horse Al Capone)
 April 27, 2016 – June 19, 2016: 2016 FEI World Cup Jumping – Central Asian League
 Winner:  Nurjon Tuyakbaev (with horse King Cornet L)
 April 28, 2016 – November 27, 2016: 2016 FEI World Cup Jumping – South America League
 North SAL winner:  Noel Vanososte (with horse Conrad D)
 South SAL winner:  Martin Rodriguez Vanni (with horse Liborius)
 April 29, 2016 – October 30, 2016: 2016 FEI World Cup Jumping –  South African League
 Winner:  Lisa Williams (with horse Campbell)
 May 25, 2016 – September 25, 2016: 2016 FEI World Cup Jumping – Caucasus League
 Winner:  Tornike Papiashvili (with horse Ambishen)
 May 12, 2016 – December 4, 2016: 2016 FEI World Cup Jumping – Central European League
 North CEL winner:  Maria Bibikova (with horse Quasimodo)
 South CEL winner:  Gábor Szabó, Jr. (with horse Timpex Bolcsesz)
 February 23–26, 2017: 2017 FEI World Cup Jumping – Central European League Final in  Warsaw
 Winner:  Dawid Kubiak
 July 27, 2016 – March 12, 2017 2016–17 FEI World Cup Jumping – North American League
 Eastern NAL winner:  Kent Farrington (with horses Gazelle, Creedance, and Voyeur)
 Western NAL winner:  Nayel Nassar (with horses Lordan and Acita 4)
 July 29, 2016 – January 22, 2017: 2016–17 FEI World Cup Jumping –  Australian League
 Winner:  Clint Beresford (with horse Emmaville Jitterbug)
 September 30, 2016 – February 4, 2017: 2016–17 FEI World Cup Jumping –  Arab League
 Winner:  Sheikh Ali Al-Thani (with horses Carolina 31, Imperio Egipcio Milton, and Come Soon)
 October 1, 2016 – December 25, 2016: 2016 FEI World Cup Jumping – South East Asian League
 Winner:  Jaruporn Limpichati (with horse Irregular Choice)
 October 13, 2016 – February 26, 2017: 2016–17 FEI World Cup Jumping –  Western European League
 Winner:  Kevin Staut (with three different horses)
 October 19, 2016 – January 15, 2017: 2016–17 FEI World Cup Jumping –  League
 Winner:  Katie Laurie (with horses Casebrooke Lomond & On the Point Eve)

2016–17 FEI World Cup Dressage
 April 13, 2016 – December 11, 2016: 2016 FEI World Cup Dressage – Central European League
 Winner:  Inessa Merkulova with horse Mister X
 April 28, 2016 – October 2, 2016: 2016 FEI World Cup Dressage – North American League
 Winner:  Jacqueline Brooks with horse D. Niro
 May 26, 2016 – March 12, 2017: 2016–17 FEI World Cup Dressage – Western European League
 Winner:  Isabell Werth with horses Emilo, Don Johnson FRH, & Weihegold Old
 February 1–4: 2017 FEI World Cup Dressage – Pacific League
 Winner:  Wendi Williamson with horse Déjà vu MH

2017 Show Jumping World Cup and Dressage World Cup Finals
 March 27 – April 2: 2017 FEI World Cup Show Jumping and Dressage Finals in  Omaha, Nebraska
 Winners:  McLain Ward with horse HH Azur (show jumping) /  Isabell Werth with horse Weihegold (dressage)

2017 FEI Nations Cup Jumping
 February 14 – October 1: 2017 FEI Nations Cup Jumping Season
 February 14–19: NCJ #1 in  Ocala, Florida
 Individual winners:  Cian O'Connor (with horse Seringat),  Beezie Madden (with horse Breitling LS),  Tiffany Foster (with horse Victor)
 Team winners:  (Shane Sweetnam (with horse Chaqui Z), Kevin Babington (with horse Shorapur), Richie Moloney (with horse Carrabis Z), Cian O'Connor (with horse Seringat))
 February 15–18: NCJ #2 in  Al Ain
 Individual winners:  Patrice Delaveau (with horse Aquila Hdc),  Philippe Rozier (with horse Rahotep de Toscane),  Sheikh Ali Al-Thani (with horse First Division)
 Team winners:  (Philippe Rozier (with horse Rahotep de Toscane), Frédéric David (with horse Equador Van'T Roosakker), Adeline Hecart (with horse Pasha du Gue), Patrice Delaveau (with horse Aquila Hdc))
 April 26–30: NCJ #3 in  Lummen
 Individual winners:  Olivier Philippaerts (with horse H&M Cabrio van de Heffinck),  Mario Stevens (with horse Baloubet 4),  Gerardo Meléndez Mieres (with horse Cassino DC)
 Team winners:  (Maurice Tebbel (with horse Chacco's Son), Holger Wulschner (with horse BSC Skipper), Mario Stevens (with horse Baloubet 4), André Thieme (with horse Conthendrix))
 May 4–7: NCJ #4 in  Linz-Ebelsberg
 Individual winners:  Jérôme Guery (with horse Grand Cru van de Rozenberg),  Zuzana Zelinkova (with horse Caleri II),  Robert Whitaker (with horse Catwalk IV)
 Team winners:  (Emanuele Gaudiano (with horse Chalou), Davide Sbardella (with horse Triomphe van Schuttershof), Luca Maria Moneta (with horse Herold N), Luca Marziani (with horse Tokyo du Soleil))
 May 4–7: NCJ #5 in  Coapexpan (Veracruz)
 Individual winner:  Keean White (with horse For Freedom Z)
 Team winners:  (Antonio Maurer (with horse Galileo de Laubry), Patricio Pasquel (with horse Babel), Federico Fernández (with horse Landpeter do Feroleto), Antonio Chedraui Eguia (with horse Ninloubet))
 May 11–14: NCJ #6 in  La Baule-Escoublac
 Individual winners:  Pénélope Leprevost (with horse Flora de Mariposa),  Shane Breen (with horse Golden Hawk),  Paul Estermann (with horse Lord Pepsi)
 Team winners:  (Cedric Angot (with horse Saxo de La Cour), Kevin Staut (with horse Reveur de Hurtebise HDC), Roger-Yves Bost (with horse Sangria du Coty), Pénélope Leprevost (with horse Flora de Mariposa))
 May 11–14: NCJ #7 in  Drammen
 Individual winner:  Alexis Deroubaix (with horse Timon D'Aure)
 Team winners:  (Alexander Butler (with horse Hallowberry Cruz), Mark Mcauley (with horse Utchan de Belheme), Cameron Hanley (with horse Quirex), Captain Geoff Curran (with horse Ringwood Glen))
 May 24–28: NCJ #8 in  Rome
 Individual winners:  Alberto Zorzi (with horse Fair Light van T Heike),  Douglas Lindelöw (with horse Zacramento),  Steve Guerdat (with horse Bianca)
 Team winners:  (Piergiorgio Bucci (with horse Casallo Z), Alberto Zorzi (with horse Fair Light van T Heike), Lorenzo de Luca (with horse Ensor de Litrange LXII), Bruno Chimirri (with horse Tower Mouche))
 May 25–28: NCJ #9 in  Lisbon
 Individual winners:  Constant van Paesschen (with horse Carlow van de Helle),  Diego Pérez Bilbao (with horse HH Best Buy),  Fabienne Daigneux Lange (with horse Venue d'Fees des Hazalles)
 Team winners:  (Constant van Paesschen (with horse Carlow van de Helle), Fabienne Daigneux Lange (with horse Venue d'Fees des Hazalles), Jos Verlooy (with horse Caracas), Nicola Philippaerts (with horse Chilli Willi))
 May 31 – June 4: NCJ #10 in  Langley, British Columbia
 Individual winner:  Daniel Coyle (with horse Cita)
 Team winners:  (Adrienne Sternlicht (with horse Cristalline), Margie Goldstein-Engle (with horse Royce), Catherine Nicole Tyree (with horse Bokai), Heather Caristo-Williams (with horse Qui Vive des Songes Z))
 June 1–4: NCJ #11 in  St. Gallen
 Individual winners:  Steve Guerdat (with horse Bianca),  Angelie von Essen (with horse Newton Abbot),  Roger-Yves Bost (with horse Sangria du Coty)
 Team winners:  (Luca Marziani (with horse Tokyo du Soleil), Paolo Paini (with horse Ottava Meraviglia di Ca' San G), Emilio Bicocchi (with horse Sassicaia Ares), Lorenzo de Luca (with horse Armitages Boy))
 June 1–5: NCJ #12 in  Uggerhalne
 Individual winners:  Soren Moeller Rohde (with horse Velerne ASK),  Alexander Zetterman (with horse Cordalis 8),  William Funnell (with horse Billy Buckingham)
 Team winners:  (Lars Bak Andersen (with horse Carrasco), Soren Moeller Rohde (with horse Velerne ASK), Thomas Sandgaard (with horse Amarone), Thomas Velin (with horse Chopin van het Moleneind))
 June 8–11: NCJ #13 in  Sopot
 Individual winner:  Laura Kraut (with horse Deauville S)
 Team winners:  (Lauren Hough (with horse Waterford), Paris Sellon (with horse Cassandra), Chloe Reid (with horse Codarco), Laura Kraut (with horse Deauville S))
 June 22–25: NCJ #14 in  Rotterdam
 Individual winners:  Henrik von Eckermann (with horse Cantinero),  Steve Guerdat (with horse Bianca),  Lorenzo de Luca (with horse Armitages Boy),  Eduardo Álvarez Aznar (with horse Rokfeller de Pleville Bois Margot),  Harrie Smolders (with horse Don VHP Z),  Marcus Ehning (with horse Pret A Tout),  Bertram Allen (with horse Hector van d'Abdijhoeve)
 Team winners:  (Henrik von Eckermann (with horse Cantinero), Rolf-Göran Bengtsson (with horse Clarimo Ask), Douglas Lindelöw (with horse Zacramento), Peder Fredricson (with horse H&M All In))
 June 29 – July 2: NCJ #15 in  Roeser
 Individual winners:  Diego Pérez Bilbao (with horse HH Best Buy),  Philipp Züger (with horse Casanova F Z),  Catherine van Roosbroeck (with horse Gautcho da Quinta),  Abdullah Mohd al-Marri (with horse Sama Dubai FBH)
 Team winners:  (Catherine van Roosbroeck (with horse Gautcho da Quinta), Dominique Hendrickx (with horse Bacardi Les Hauts), Nicola Philippaerts (with horse H&M Harley VD Bisschop), Wilm Vermeir (with horse IQ van Het Steentje))
 July 13–16: NCJ #16 in  Falsterbo
 Individual winners:  Meredith Michaels-Beerbaum (with horse Daisy),  Shane Sweetnam (with horse Chaqui Z),  Chloe Reid (with horse Codarco),  Henrik von Eckermann (with horse Mary Lou 194)
 Team winners:  (Ruben Romp (with horse Audi'S Teavanta II C Z), Aniek Poels (with horse Athene), Michel Hendrix (with horse Baileys), Jur Vrieling (with horse Vdl Glasgow V. Merelsnest))
 July 27–30: NCJ #17 in  Hickstead
 Individual winners:  Kevin Staut (with horse For Joy Van't Zorgvliet HDC),  Harrie Smolders (with horse Don VHP Z),  Pedro Veniss (with horse For Felicila),  Marlon Modolo Zanotelli (with horse Sirene de La Motte)
 Team winners:  (Marlon Modolo Zanotelli (with horse Sirene de La Motte), Pedro Veniss (with horse For Felicila), Yuri Mansur (with horse Babylotte), Pedro Junqueira Muylaert (with horse Prince Royal Z Mfs))
 August 9–13: NCJ #18 in  Dublin
 Individual winners:  Michael Greeve (with horse Whitney BB),  Lauren Hough (with horse Ohlala),  Laura Kraut (with horse Confu),  Olivier Robert (with horse Eros)
 Team winners:  (Lauren Hough (with horse Ohlala), Lillie Keenan (with horse Super Sox), Beezie Madden (with horse Darry Lou), Laura Kraut (with horse Confu))
 August 30 – September 4: NCJ #19 in  Gijón
 Individual winners:  Nicolas Delmotte (with horse Ilex VP),  Ben Maher (with horse MTF Madame X),  Roelof Bril (with horse Arlando),  Shane Breen (with horse Ipswich van de Wolfsakker)
 Team winners:  (Kevin Staut (with horse For Joy van't Zorgvliet HDC), Edward Levy (with horse Sirius Black), Grégory Cottard (with horse Regate d'Aure), Nicolas Delmotte (with horse Ilex VP))
 September 28 – October 1: NCJ #20 (final) in  Barcelona
 There were ten show jumpers that have no faults.
 Team winners:  (Jur Vrieling (with horse Vdl Glasgow V. Merelsnest), Michel Hendrix (with horse Baileys), Marc Houtzager (with horse Sterrehof's Calimero), Harrie Smolders (with horse Don Vhp Z))

2017 FEI Nations Cup Dressage
 March 21 – July 30: 2017 FEI Nations Cup Dressage Season
 March 21–26: NCD #1 in  Wellington, Florida
 Individual winner:  Tina Irwin with horse Laurencio
 Team winners:  (Tina Irwin with horse Laurencio, Jaimey Irwin with horse Donegal V, Megan Lane with horse Caravella, & Jill Irving with horse Degas 12)
 May 5–7: NCD #2 in  Kyiv
 Event cancelled.
 May 18–21: NCD #3 in  Compiègne
 Individual winner:  Spencer Wilton with horse Super Nova II
 Team winners:  (Spencer Wilton with horse Super Nova II, Hayley Watson-Greaves with horse Rubins Nite, Gareth Hughes with horse Don Carissimo, Daniel Watson with horse Amadeus)
 June 1–5: NCD #4 in  Uggerhalne
 Individual winner:  Anna Kasprzak with horse Donnperignon
 Team winners:  (Anna Kasprzak with horse Donnperignon, Daniel Bachmann Andersen with horse Blue Hors Zack, Agnete Kirk Thinggaard with horse Jojo AZ, Charlotte Heering with horse Bufranco)
 June 22–25: NCD #5 in  Rotterdam
 Individual winner:  Laura Graves with horse Verdades
 Team winners:  (Laura Graves with horse Verdades, Kasey Perry-Glass with horse Goerklintgaards Dublet, Olivia Lagoy-Weltz with horse Lonoir, Dawn White-O'Connor with horse Legolas 92)
 July 13–16: NCD #6 in  Falsterbo
 Individual winner:  Patrik Kittel with horse Deja
 Team winners:  (Patrik Kittel with horse Deja, Tinne Vilhelmson-Silfvén with horse Paridon Magi, Rose Mathisen with horse Zuidenwind 1187)
 July 19–23: NCD #7 in  Aachen
 Individual winner:  Isabell Werth with horse Weihegold Old
 Team winners:  (Isabell Werth with horse Weihegold Old, Sönke Rothenberger with horse Cosmo 59, Dorothee Schneider with horse Sammy Davis Jr., Hubertus Schmidt with horse Imperio 3)
 July 27–30: NCD #8 (final) in  Hickstead
 Individual winner:  Pierre Volla with horse Badinda Altena
 Team winners:  (Nicole Faverau with horse Ginsengue, Ludovic Henry with horse After You, Arnaud Serre with horse Ultrablue de Massa, Pierre Volla with horse Badinda Altena)

2017 FEI Nations Cup Eventing
 April 22 – October 8: 2017 FEI Nations Cup Eventing Season
 April 22 & 23: NCE #1 in  Montelibretti
 Event cancelled.
 May 17–21: NCE #2 in  Strzegom
 Individual winner:  Kai Rüder (with horse Colani Sunrise)
 Team winners:  (Andreas Dibowski (with horse FRH Butts Avedon), Falk-Filip-Finn Westerich (with horse FBW Gina K), Beeke Jankowski (with horse Tiberius 20), Jörg Kurbel (with horse Entertain You))
 May 25–28: NCE #3 in  Houghton Hall
 Individual winner:  Bettina Hoy (with horse Seigneur Medicott)
 Team winners:  (Bettina Hoy (with horse Seigneur Medicott), Julia Krajewski (with horse Samourai du Thot), Andreas Ostholt (with horse So Is ET, Christoph Wahler (with horse Green Mount Flight))
 May 31 – June 4: NCE #4 in  Ratoath (Tattersalls)
 Individual winner:  Luc Château (with horse Propriano de L'Ebat)
 Team winners:  (Luc Château (with horse Propriano de L'Ebat), Sidney Dufresne (with horse Tresor Mail), Raphael Cochet (with horse Sherazad de Louviere), Pierre Touzaint (with horse Scapin du Brio))
 June 30 – July 2: NCE #5 in  Wiener Neustadt
 Individual winner:  Georgie Spence (with horse Halltown Harley)
 Team winners:  (Felix Etzel (with horse Bandit 436), Jörg Kurbel (with horse Brookfield de Bouncer), Nicolai Aldinger (with horse Newell), Vanessa Bölting (with horse Carlson B))
 July 8 & 9: NCE #6 in  The Plains, Virginia
 Individual winner:  Jennie Brannigan (with horse Cambalda)
 Team winners:  (Jennie Brannigan (with horse Cambalda), Lynn Symansky (with horse Donner), Phillip Dutton (with horse I'm Sew Ready), Boyd Martin (with horse Steady Eddie))
 July 19–23: NCE #7 in  Aachen
 Individual winner:  Ingrid Klimke (with horse Horseware Hale Bob Old)
 Team winners:  (Ingrid Klimke (with horse Horseware Hale Bob Old), Michael Jung (with horse La Biosthetique – Sam FBW), Sandra Auffarth (with horse Opgun Louvo), Josefa Sommer (with horse Hamilton 24))
 August 10–13: NCE #8 in  Le Pin-au-Haras
 Individual winner:  Chris Burton (with horse Quality Purdey)
 Team winners:  (Karim Florent Laghouag (with horse Entebbe de Hus), Lionel Guyon (with horse Tactic de Lalou), Nicolas Touzaint (with horse Topsecret d'Eglefin), Thibault Fournier (with horse Siniant de Lathus))
 September 22–24: NCE #9 in  Waregem
 Individual winner:  Maxime Livio (with horse Pica d'Or)
 Team winners:  (Julia Mestern (with horse Grand Prix Iwest), Anna-Maria Rieke (with horse Petite Dame), Leonie Kuhlmann (with horse Cascora), Sandra Auffarth (with horse Viamant du Matz))
 October 5–8: NCE #10 (final) in  Boekelo
 Individual winner:  Tim Price (with horse Cekatinka)
 Team winners:  (Tim Price (with horse Cekatinka), Mark Todd (with horse McClaren), Daniel Jocelyn (with horse Grovine de Reve), Blyth Tait (with horse Havanna van 'T Castaneahof))

2017 Longines Global Champions Tour
 April 6 – November 11: 2017 Longines Global Champions Tour Season
 April 6–9: 2017 LGCT #1 in  Mexico City Winner:  Martin Fuchs with horse Chaplin
 April 13–15: 2017 LGCT #2 in  Miami Beach Winner:  Jérôme Guery with horse Grand Cru van de Rozenberg
 April 28–30: 2017 LGCT #3 in  Shanghai Winner:  Lorenzo de Luca with horse Ensor de Litrange LXII
 May 19–21: 2017 LGCT #4 in  Madrid Winner:  Kent Farrington with horse Gazelle
 May 24–28: 2017 LGCT #5 in  Hamburg Winner:  Rolf-Göran Bengtsson with horse Casall ASK
 June 8–10: 2017 LGCT #6 in  Cannes Winner:  Sergio Álvarez Moya with horse Arrayan
 June 23–25: 2017 LGCT #7 in  Winner:  Alberto Zorzi with horse Cornetto K
 June 30 – July 2: 2017 LGCT #8 in  Paris Winner:  Julien Epaillard with horse Usual Suspect d'Auge
 July 7 & 8: 2017 LGCT #9 in  Cascais-Estoril Winner:  Danielle Goldstein with horse Lizziemary
 July 13–16: 2017 LGCT #10 in  Chantilly, Oise Winner:  Harrie Smolders with horse Emerald N.O.P.
 July 28–30: 2017 LGCT #11 in  Berlin Winner:  Christian Ahlmann with horse Codex One
 August 4–6: 2017 LGCT #12 in  London Winner:  Scott Brash with horse Hello Forever
 August 11–13: 2017 LGCT #13 in  Valkenswaard Winner:  Lorenzo de Luca with horse Ensor de Litrange LXII
 September 21–24: 2017 LGCT #14 in  Rome Winner:  Evelina Tovek with horse Castello 194
 November 9–11: 2017 LGCT #15 (final) in  Doha Winner:  Bassem Hassan Mohammed with horse Gunder

2017 Spruce Meadows Jumping Tournaments
 June 7–11: The National
 Main event: The RBC Grand Prix presented by Rolex
 Winner:  Patricio Pasquel (with horse Babel)
 June 14–18: The Continental
 Main event: The CP Grand Prix
 Winner:  Sameh el-Dahan (with horse Sumas Zorro)
 June 27 – July 2: The Pan American
 Main event: The Pan American Cup presented by ROLEX
 Winner:  Pedro Veniss (with horse Quabri de Lisle)
 July 5–9: The North American
 Main event: The ATCO Queen Elizabeth II Cup
 Winner:  Kent Farrington (with horse Gazelle)
 September 6–10: The Masters
 Main event #1 -> The BMO Nations Cup
 Winners:  (Lauren Hough (with horse Waterford), Charlie Jacobs (with horse Cassinja S), Lillie Keenan (with horse Fibonacci 17), & Beezie Madden (with horse Darry Lou))
 Main event #2 -> The CP 'International' presented by Rolex
 Winner:  Philipp Weishaupt (with horse LB Convall)

Horse racing

Triple Crowns

US Triple Crown
May 6: Kentucky Derby at  Churchill Downs
 Horse:  Always Dreaming; Jockey:  John R. Velazquez; Trainer:  Todd Pletcher
May 20: Preakness Stakes at  Pimlico Race Course
 Horse:  Cloud Computing; Jockey:  Javier Castellano; Trainer:  Chad Brown
June 10: Belmont Stakes at  Belmont Park
 Horse:  Tapwrit; Jockey:  Jose Ortiz; Trainer:  Todd Pletcher

Canadian Triple Crown
July 2: Queen's Plate at  Woodbine Racetrack
 Horse:  Holy Helena; Jockey:  Luis Contreras; Trainer:  James A. Jerkens
July 25: Prince of Wales Stakes at  Fort Erie Race Track
 Horse:  Cool Catomine; Jockey:  Luis Contreras; Trainer:  John A. Ross
August 20: Breeders' Stakes at  Woodbine Racetrack
 Horse:  Channel Maker; Jockey:  Rafael Hernandez; Trainer:  William I. Mott

UK Triple Crown
May 6: 2,000 Guineas at   Newmarket Racecourse
 Horse:  Churchill; Jockey:  Ryan Moore; Trainer:  Aidan O'Brien
June 3: Epsom Derby at  Epsom Downs Racecourse
 Horse:  Wings of Eagles; Jockey:  Padraig Beggy; Trainer:  Aidan O'Brien
September 16: St Leger at  Doncaster Racecourse
 Horse:  Capri; Jockey:  Ryan Moore; Trainer:  Aidan O'Brien

Irish Triple Crown
May 27: Irish 2,000 Guineas at the  Curragh Racecourse
 Horse:  Churchill; Jockey:  Ryan Moore; Trainer:  Aidan O'Brien
July 1: Irish Derby at the  Curragh Racecourse
 Horse:  Capri; Jockey:  Seamie Heffernan; Trainer:  Aidan O'Brien
September 10: Irish St. Leger at the  Curragh Racecourse
 Horse:  Order of St George; Jockey:  Ryan Moore; Trainer:  Aidan O'Brien

French Triple Crown
May 14: Poule d'Essai des Poulains (French 2,000 Guineas) at  Longchamp Racecourse
 Horse:  Brametot; Jockey:  Cristian Demuro; Trainer:  Jean-Claude Rouget
June 4: Prix du Jockey Club (French Derby) at  Chantilly Racecourse
 Horse:  Brametot; Jockey:  Cristian Demuro; Trainer:  Jean-Claude Rouget
July 14: Grand Prix de Paris at  Longchamp Racecourse
 Horse:  Shakeel; Jockey:  Christophe Soumillon; Trainer:  Alain de Royer-Dupré

Australian Triple Crown
March 4: Randwick Guineas at  Randwick Racecourse
 Horse:  Inference; Jockey:  Tommy Berry; Trainers:  Michael Hawkes, Wayne Hawkes and John Hawkes
March 18: Rosehill Guineas at  Rosehill Gardens Racecourse
 Horse:  Gingernuts; Jockey:  Opie Bosson; Trainers:  Stephen Autridge & Jamie Richards
April 1: Australian Derby at  Randwick Racecourse
 Horse:  Jon Snow; Jockey:  Damian Lane; Trainers:  Murray Baker & Andrew Forsman

Hong Kong Triple Crown
January 30: Hong Kong Stewards' Cup at  Sha Tin Racecourse
 Horse:  Helene Paragon; Jockey:  Tommy Berry; Trainer:  John Moore
February 26: Hong Kong Gold Cup at  Sha Tin Racecourse
 Horse:  Werther; Jockey:  Hugh Bowman; Trainer:  John Moore
May 28: Hong Kong Champions & Chater Cup at  Sha Tin Racecourse
 Horse:  Werther; Jockey:  Hugh Bowman; Trainer:  John Moore

Japanese Triple Crown
April 16: Satsuki Shō (Japanese 2,000 Guineas) at  Nakayama Racecourse
 Horse:  Al Ain; Jockey:  Kohei Matsuyama; Trainer:  Yasutoshi Ikee
May 28: Tokyo Yūshun (Japanese Derby) at  Tokyo Racecourse
 Horse:  Rey de Oro; Jockey:  Christophe Lemaire; Trainer:  Kazuo Fujisawa
October 22: Kikuka-shō (Japanese St Leger) at  Kyoto Racecourse
 Horse:  Kiseki; Jockey:  Mirco Demuro; Trainer:  Katsuhiko Sumii

Other notable races
January 28: Pegasus World Cup at  Gulfstream Park
Horse:  Arrogate; Jockey:  Mike E. Smith; Trainer:  Bob Baffert
March 5: Gran Premio Latinoamericano at  Valparaiso Sporting
Horse:  Sixties Song; Jockey:  Juan C. Villagra; Trainer:  Alfredo Gaitán Dassié
March 14–17: Cheltenham Festival at  Cheltenham Racecourse
March 14: Champion Hurdle
Horse:  Buveur d'Air; Jockey:  Noel Fehily; Trainer:  Nicky Henderson
March 15: Queen Mother Champion Chase
Horse:  Special Tiara; Jockey:  Noel Fehily; Trainer:  Henry de Bromhead
March 16: Stayers' Hurdle
Horse:  Nichols Canyon; Jockey:  Ruby Walsh; Trainer:  Willie Mullins
March 17: Cheltenham Gold Cup
Horse:  Sizing John; Jockey:  Robbie Power; Trainer:  Jessica Harrington
March 25: Dubai World Cup Night at  Meydan Racecourse
 Dubai World Cup
 Horse:  Arrogate; Jockey:  Mike E. Smith; Trainer:  Bob Baffert
 Dubai Sheema Classic
 Horse:  Jack Hobbs; Jockey: / William Buick; Trainer:  John Gosden
 Dubai Turf
 Horse:  Vivlos; Jockey:  João Moreira; Trainer:  Yasuo Tomomichi
April 8: Grand National at  Aintree Racecourse
Horse:  One For Arthur; Jockey:  Derek Fox; Trainer:  Lucinda Russell
April 8: Queen Elizabeth Stakes at  Randwick Racecourse
Horse:  Winx; Jockey:  Hugh Bowman; Trainer:  Chris Waller
April 30: Queen Elizabeth II Cup at  Sha Tin Racecourse
June 20–24: Royal Ascot at  Ascot Racecourse
June 20: St. James's Palace Stakes
June 21: Prince of Wales's Stakes
June 22: Gold Cup
June 23: Coronation Stakes
June 24: Diamond Jubilee Stakes
June 25: Takarazuka Kinen at  Hanshin Racecourse
July 2: Grand Prix de Saint-Cloud at  Saint-Cloud Racecourse
July 29: King George VI and Queen Elizabeth Stakes at  Ascot Racecourse
August 12: Arlington Million at  Arlington Park
August 19: Pacific Classic at  Del Mar Racetrack
August 23: International Stakes at  York Racecourse
August 26: Travers Stakes at  Saratoga Race Course
September 9: Irish Champion Stakes at  Leopardstown Racecourse
October 1: Prix de l'Arc de Triomphe at  Longchamp Racecourse
October: Jockey Club Gold Cup at  Belmont Park
October: Canadian International Stakes at  Woodbine Racetrack
October 14: The Everest at  Randwick Racecourse
October 21: British Champions Day at  Ascot Racecourse
 Champion Stakes
 Queen Elizabeth II Stakes
October 28: Cox Plate at  Moonee Valley Racecourse
November 3–4: Breeders' Cup at  Del Mar Racetrack
November 3: Breeders' Cup Distaff
November 4: Breeders' Cup Classic
November 4: Breeders' Cup Turf
November 4: Breeders' Cup Mile
November 7: Melbourne Cup at  Flemington Racecourse
November 26: Japan Cup at  Tokyo Racecourse
December 10: Hong Kong International Races at  Sha Tin Racecourse
 Hong Kong Cup
December 24: Arima Kinen at  Nakayama Racecourse

References

External links
 International Federation for Equestrian Sports – FEI – official website
 Inside FEI Website

 
Equestrian by year